Amoroso's Baking Company is a commercial bakery operating out of the greater Philadelphia metropolitan area.

History
The company was founded in 1904 in Camden, New Jersey, by Vincenzo Amoroso and his sons, Salvatore and Joseph.  Having outgrown their location in Camden, the company moved to a new facility at 6505 Haverford Avenue in Philadelphia in 1914.  The company thrived during the Great Depression by making home deliveries twice a day, in the mornings and afternoons.

In 1934, Salvatore took over the operations of the company with the help of his sons, Daniel, Vincent, Leonard and Sal, Jr.  In 1952, Amoroso began selling Hearth Baked bread and rolls to A & P Supermarkets in West Philadelphia. Due to increased demand, in 1960 the company expanded into a new facility located at 845 South 55th Street. Today, after four major expansions, Amoroso Baking Company employs more than 400 people, and its expanded line of baked goods is available in more than 36 states.  The company is still owned and managed by members of the Amoroso family, and is still one of the dominant bakeries in the Philadelphia area.

Formerly located in West Philadelphia, in 2015 Amoroso announced they would move operations to Bellmawr, New Jersey, where they are now located.

References

Manufacturing companies based in Philadelphia
1904 establishments in New Jersey
Cuisine of Philadelphia
American companies established in 1904
Food and drink companies established in 1904
Family-owned companies of the United States